Pajukurmu (formerly, Pajupuustuse) is a village in Luunja Parish, Tartu County in eastern Estonia.

The tallest radio mast in Estonia, Kavastu Radio Mast, is located in Pajukurmu. The  structure was built in 2000.

References

Villages in Tartu County